The Polytechnic Harriers is an athletic club with long ties to what is now the London Marathon. In 1908 they oversaw the opening and closing ceremonies for the 1908 Olympics, the Game's marathon, and played a large part in the development of the Polytechnic Marathon, which ran from 1909- 1996. The Polytechnic Harriers were based at the Chiswick track and their history with racing events predated "the Poly" since they oversaw walking races from London to Brighton as far back as 1897.

The club was founded by philanthropist Quintin Hogg in 1883, and they were known for four years as the Hanover United AC, and were the athletics arm of Quintin Hogg's Regent Street Polytechnic.  In 1985 The Polytechnic Harriers merged with The Royal Borough of Kingston AC, a women's club that evolved from Surrey AC, and it is now known as Kingston AC and Polytechnic Harriers (Kingston & Poly). The Polytechnic's Kinnaird and Sward Trophies are still contested annually at Kingston & Poly's home track - Kingsmeadow. The Polytechnic Marathon is no longer held, having been superseded by the London Marathon. Kingston & Poly's men now compete nationally in the British Athletics League and, at area level, the men and women operate jointly in the Southern Athletics League, although they were relegated to lesser divisions in 2016.

Among the notable athletes who ran with the Club is Harry Edward, Britain's first Black Olympic medalist.
The Club's archives are still held at the University of Westminster.

References

Sports clubs in London
Athletics clubs in London
Athletics clubs in England
1883 establishments in England